Acianthera teres is a species of orchid.

teres
Plants described in 2003